Johan Erkgärds (born 12 November 1989 in Hagfors) is a Swedish ice hockey forward who currently plays for the Frisk Tigers of the Norwegian GET-ligaen. During the 2006/07-season Erkgärds played eight games with Färjestad. The rest of the season has he played with the club's U18 team. Erkgärds was eligible for the 2008 NHL Entry Draft but was not selected.

External links 

1989 births
Living people
People from Hagfors
Swedish ice hockey forwards
Bofors IK players
Frisk Asker Ishockey players
Färjestad BK players
Swedish expatriates in Norway
Sportspeople from Värmland County